The 1917 Belfast South by-election was held on 2 July 1917.  The by-election was held due to the death of the incumbent Conservative MP, James Chambers.  It was won by the Conservative candidate William Arthur Lindsay, who was elected unopposed.

Results

References

External links 
A Vision Of Britain Through Time

1917 elections in the United Kingdom
South, 1917
Unopposed by-elections to the Parliament of the United Kingdom in Irish constituencies
1917 elections in Ireland
20th century in Belfast
July 1917 events